El Lilady  is a 2007 studio album by Amr Diab. The album was awarded a World Music Award as the best selling album in the Middle East for 2007.

Commercial performance
The album achieved huge sales, with +2,000,000 copies sold and occupied the first place in Egypt for 22 consecutive weeks.

N'eoul Eih video
The video for N'eoul Eih was released on 14 August 2007. The video was directed by Marawan Hamed, and was filmed in Malibu, California.

Track listing 
"Ne'oul Aih" - نقول إيه - (What would we say) - 4:01
"El Lilady" - الليلة دي - (Tonight) - 2:55
"Toul Mana Shaifak" - طول مانا شايفك - (As long as I see you) - 3:28
"Hikayat" - حكايات - (Stories) - 4:04
"Enta El Ghaly" - انت الغالي - (You're the precious) - 3:47
"Rohy Mertahalak" - روحي مرتاحة لك - (My soul is at ease with you) - 3:41
"Aletly Oul" - قالت لي قول - (She told me to say) - 3:28
"We Fehmt Einik" - وفهمت عينيك - (I understand your eyes) - 3:41
"Dehket" - ضحكت - (She smiled) - 3:29
"Khalik Ma'aya" - خليك معايا - (Stay with me) - 3:54

References

2007 albums
Amr Diab albums
Rotana Records albums